Representative matches in Australian rules football are matches between representative teams played under the Australian rules, most notably of the colonies and later Australian states and territories that have been held since 1879. For most of the 20th century, the absence of a national club competition in Australia and international matches meant that intercolonial and later interstate matches were regarded with great importance.

Interstate matches were, in most cases, sanctioned and coordinated by the Australian National Football Council (ANFC), which organised every national championship series from the first-ever national carnival, the Jubilee Australasian Football Carnival in 1908 with the exception of the last-ever series: the 1993 State of Origin Championships, which was run by the AFL Commission. The series took place on approximately three-yearly intervals between 1908 and 1993; these were usually a fortnight-long tournament staged in a single host city, although some – particularly those played in the 1980s – were based on the results of matches played in different cities throughout the year. Between 1937 and 1988, the player judged the best at each of these carnivals was awarded the Tassie Medal; and between 1953 and 1988, the selection of All-Australian Teams was based on the player's performance during Australian Football Carnivals, and the team was named after each carnival concluded.

Until June, 1977, interstate Australian rules football games were played by teams representing the major football leagues or organisations, with players representing the State or Territory they were playing in at the time. From October, 1977 until May, 1999, players were selected for their states under partial or full State of Origin selection rules. Football historian John Devaney has argued that: "some of the state of origin contests which took place during the 1980s constituted arguably the finest expositions of the game ever seen".

There have been no regular representative Australian rules football matches featuring players from the fully professional Australian Football League since 1999. Representatives matches continue to be played annually between teams representing the state or territorial leagues at the second tier or below. One senior women's State of Origin match was played in 2017. Representative matches are played at underage level as part of the men's and women's Underage National Championships, notably the AFL Under-19 Championships and AFL Women's Under-18 Championships.

Throughout its pre–State of Origin history, Victoria, as represented by the Victorian Football League, was the dominant state in representative football, winning 16 of the 19 carnivals up until 1975. Competition was more even during the nine competitions held in the State of Origin selection era, with championships shared among Western Australia (4), South Australia (3) and Victoria (2).

History

Intercolony / Interstate competition, 1879–1939 

Victoria the birthplace of Australian rules and, with contributing factors such as population and finances, dominated the first hundred years of intercolonial and interstate football. This was the case in the first-ever intercolonial representative match, held on Tuesday, 1 July 1879 (a public holiday), at East Melbourne Cricket Ground. The final score was Victoria (represented by the Victorian Football Association) 7.14 to South Australia 0.3. The match was attended by more than 10,000 people.

The third and fourth teams to commence intercolonial competition were New South Wales and Queensland, playing each other in a two-game series in Brisbane in 1884; the result of the series was a one-all draw. Tasmania played its first game, against Victoria, in 1887. New Zealand (Maori) entered the competition with a draw against New South Wales in Sydney, on 29 June 1889.

Victoria's long-term dominance briefly faltered in the 1890s, when other Colonies recorded their first-ever wins over the Victoria: South Australia in Adelaide in 1890 and 1891 and Tasmania in Hobart in 1893 (twice). In 1897, the new Victorian Football League split from the VFA, and the two selected separate representative teams, further weakening Victoria in intercolonial competition, which became interstate competition following Federation of the six British colonies in Australia, in 1901.

Western Australia played its first two interstate games in 1904, including a win over South Australia in Adelaide. The Australasian Football Council was established 1906, and it assumed administration for interstate football.

The VFL's dominance within Victoria was established by the time an interstate carnival was held for the first time – in Melbourne in 1908 – to celebrate the Golden Jubilee of "Australasian football" (as it was known at the time). The widening gap between the three major footballing States/leagues and the others was shown in the organisation of the competition: Victoria (represented by the VFL), South Australia and Western Australia constituted "Section A", and Tasmania, New South Wales, Queensland and New Zealand constituted "Section B". The VFA did not take part and the carnival was New Zealand's last appearance in representative football. Victoria went through the competition undefeated.

The second carnival was played in 1911, in Adelaide, which set the pattern of a carnival every three years. South Australia went undefeated and Victoria won three of their four matches. At the Sydney carnival of 1914, Victoria was once again undefeated. Following the onset of World War I interstate matches went into a five-year hiatus.

Throughout following decades, standalone interstate matches were held every year, and interstate carnivals were held usually every three years, with a few exceptions.  In most carnivals following World War II, the stronger states competed separately from the minor states; and on many occasions the stronger states and minor states carnivals were held in separate locations or years. At the peak of its popularity, the carnival was known symbolically as "the Ashes" of Australian rules football. Victoria (VFL) continued its dominance in interstate football by winning 17 of the 20 carnivals held between the period 1908 to 1975, and usually winning the individual matches held every year.

Some notable moments during this period were, the 1923 Victorian loss to South Australia, which was described as the state's worst ever defeat. The 1923 South Australian upset loss to an undermanned Tasmania. The championship-deciding game of the 1924 carnival, between Victoria and Western Australia, was reported as being the roughest on record. Also in 1924 South Australia recorded the concepts highest winning score, winning by 268 points to defeat Queensland in Hobart. In the 1925 calendar year, Canberra played its first match against New South Wales. In 1923 & 1925 Victoria lost shock upsets to New South Wales. In 1927, in the Australia National Football Carnival Victoria beat Western Australia 11.10 to 10.12, in what has been described as one of the hardest and fiercest games fought in the history of the code. In 1928 Victoria and South Australia participated in the first drawn representative match: the visiting Victorians led for most of the match, with South Australia kicking three late goals to give the state the victory by a point; however, after the match, it was discovered that the scoreboard had failed to record one of Victoria's behinds, and the match was declared a draw.

Post World War II (1945 to 1977)
In the second game between South Australia and Victoria after war, the states participated in the second representative draw, in a high scoring affair with the side locked in at 123 to 123 at full time. In 1948, Victoria played Western Australia for the first time in ten years, which Western Australia went on to win by 38 points, in what was described as a memorable victory.

The Australian National Football Council expanded in 1949, which saw the Victoria Football Association and the Australian Amateur Football Council each re-enter teams in carnival and interstate competitions. The Amateurs were frequent winners of the second division carnivals, and the VFA recorded an upset 8-point win against South Australia at the 1950 interstate carnival. The VFA overall had mixed results while readmitted back, with some wins over some of the main states, and large losses, and established a rivalry with Tasmania against whom it had a number of close results on both sides. In 1959, Victoria beat Western Australia by 178 points, with the loss in Western Australia being taken so badly that it had been reported as potentially being the end of interstate football in the state. Tasmania finished of the decade strongly, with two surprise carnival upsets over South Australia in 1956 and 1958 and Western Australia in 1958.

In the first half of the 1960s saw a brief changing of the guard, with South Australia and Western Australia recording several wins over Victoria, and an upset win by Tasmania over Victoria in 1960, considered one of Tasmanian football's greatest moments. Also the 1963 Tasmanian victory over reigning interstate carnival champions Western Australia. Those were Victoria's last losses of the pre-origin selection era, and Victoria went on a 12-year winning streak against Western Australia and an 18-year winning streak against South Australia.

Neil Kerley and Graham Cornes were of significance in the rivalry between Victoria and South Australia, who played for and coached the South Australia team during this period. Neil Kerley when coaching the South Australian team would engender a hatred for Victoria, telling his players that all Victorian umpires and players cheated. Graham Cornes, who was coached by Kerley for South Australia and was later a coach and central figure in the promotion of interstate football in South Australia, later stated that his hatred for Victoria came from Neil Kerley, and in establishing the culture in South Australia of wanting to prove superiority over Victoria. In the 1963 game, after Victorian Jack Dyer was asked what he would do if he was coaching Victoria, and disrespectfully responded I'd give them a pep talk and go to the races, Kerley opened the match by putting down two Victorians with heavy bumps, and South Australia went on to win by seven points.

In the first half of the 1970s, there were some important games played: in 1970 Western Australia played Victoria in Melbourne, with the home side winning by six points. The match was notable because of a native born Western Australian player, playing for Victoria, being involved in the winning play. After the match with the result not taken well in the west, because of the observation that this had been a regular occurrence, it was first started being mentioned that games should be played on State of Origin criteria. Likewise in the 1974 game between the states, with the same result occurring, with again a Western Australia player being involved in the winning play, it was reported in the west as being the last straw. After the game Western Australia began to negotiate for games to be played under State of Origin criteria.

Also in 1970 after a decade of surprise upsets, and large disappointing defeats, Tasmania recorded a memorable victory over Western Australia. In the lead up to the match, an over confident Western Australian captain Polly Farmer, announced to the media that That his side simply could not countenance anything other than a convincing win, and "If we can't beat Tasmania, we ought to give the game away,. The Tasmanians stormed home in the final moments to win the game by two points. With the game notable, for thousands screaming onto the ground after the final siren. In 1974 the Northern Territory first participated in the concept, with a win over Queensland.

State of Origin competition, 1977–1988

By the 1970s, VFL clubs were signing up an increasing number of the best players from other states and Victoria dominated state games. Led by Leon Larkin, marketing manager of the Subiaco Football Club, Western Australia began to campaign for players to be selected according to state-of-origin rules. The (WAFL) negotiated with the (VFL) for two years before agreement was reached on the format. In the first such game, at Subiaco Oval in Perth, on 8 October 1977, Western Australia defeated Victoria, 23.13 (151) to 8.9 (57), a huge reversal of the results in most previous games. In the words of football historian John Devaney:

"A Western Australian team composed entirely of home-based players had, on 25 June, taken on a Victorian team containing many of the same players who would return to Perth three and a half months later for the state of origin clash. The respective scores of the two matches offered a persuasive argument, if such were needed, of the extent to which the VFL had denuded the WAFL of its elite talent:

On 25 June 1977 Victoria 23.16 (154) defeated Western Australia 13.13 (91) – a margin of 63 points
On 8 October 1977 Western Australia 23.13 (151) defeated Victoria 8.9 (57) – a margin of 94 points, representing an overall turn around of 157 points

Western Australia's previous biggest winning margin against a Victorian state team had been a mere 38 points in 1948. Almost overnight, an inferiority complex was dismantled: Victoria, it seemed, was not intrinsically superior, only wealthier."

Games involving each of the other states soon followed. Western Australia and South Australia began to win more games against Victoria.

A full interstate carnival under state-of-origin selection was held with success in October 1979 in Perth. A second carnival was held the following October in Adelaide, but were a financial disaster for the organisers, with only 28,245 people attending the four games. Following this series, the VFL decided to not participate in any future carnivals, which put the future of the carnival concept in doubt.

Between 1983 and 1987 there was a new format introduced, with only Victoria, South Australia and Western Australia competing, where each team would play each other once during the year, rather than in a standalone carnival, and with a points system and percentage used to declare the winner. Through this period, State of Origin football continued to be popular. However, after 1986, the concept began to wane in popularity in Western Australia, with the entrance of West Coast into the expanded Victorian Football League in 1987. When the 1988 Adelaide Bicentennial Carnival ran at a loss, the carnival concept was considered near finished.

1990s: decline and end
With sponsorship from Carlton and United Breweries and the support of South Australia, the Commission organised for a blockbuster match in 1989, the first between South Australia and Victoria at the Melbourne Cricket Ground since 1971. A record State of Origin crowd of 91,960  at the match (significantly exceeding the VFL's prediction of 70,000) signalled a strong return. The minor-states carnival continued in 1989, although the Northern Territory withdrew due to financial reasons and because the carnival was played outside its conventional summer season timing. The AFL later gained formal affiliations with these states and territories signalling the end of the NFL's involvement in interstate football. The AFL Commission, taking over the role from the NFL in 1991 ruled out the minor states including Queensland and New South Wales from again playing the major states under State of Origin rules. Ad hoc matches continued to be scheduled between 1989 and 1992 without a carnival. With the expansion of the Australian Football League into Western Australia in 1987 and South Australia in 1991, the top Victorian players were now playing football matches in those states every second week as part of club matches, and a major part of the representative football's appeal disappeared.

The last interstate series recognised as a carnival was played in 1993; as a once-off, the AFL season was shortened from 22 rounds to 20 to accommodate it, and two new composite teams QLD/NT and NSW/ACT were introduced. However, from 1992 until 1994, unusual timeslots and high ticket prices made the games inaccessible to many spectators. In 1994, Graham Cornes criticised the Commission for its poor promotion of State of Origin in comparison with its rugby league equivalent, while also noting the negative impact that the nationalisation of the AFL had on interstate football's prestige.

In the AFL Commission's five-year plan released in August 1994, the Commission announced further plans to reinvigorate State of Origin, attempting to establish a competition to rival Rugby League's equivalent; this included setting aside a free week in the fixture, and introducing a new composite team to be known as the Allies to represent all states outside Victoria, South Australia and Western Australia and be more competitive against them. Before a large crowd in 1995, between the Victoria and South Australia game at the Melbourne Cricket Ground Ted Whitten, promoter of Victoria and State of Origin, was terminally ill with prostate cancer, and was paraded around the ground prior to the match, with Mariah Carey's Hero being played over the PA system, for his service to the concept and the game, in a moment which has been voted as the most memorable moment in the game's history. However, Tom Hafey noted an increase in clubs discouraging players from playing due to risk of injury, and an increasing reluctance from players themselves.

Two state of origin matches were played on a free weekend in the AFL season each year between 1995 and 1998, featuring the four teams: Allies, Victoria, South Australia and Western Australia – but aside from 1997 when a Victoria and South Australia game got a large crowd, low crowds and an annual $800,000 cost to stage the series persisted. Only one match was played in 1999, with Victoria 17.19 (121) defeating South Australia 10.7 (67) before a crowd of 26,063 in rainy conditions; it would prove to be the last state of origin game. The match dropped from the 2000 season because the season's compressed schedule – which saw it played a month earlier than usual to accommodate the 2000 Summer Olympics in Sydney – did not allow for the week's break; but state of origin never returned to the calendar thereafter.

21st century
There have been two once-off representative matches played during the 21st century, each between Victoria and a single composite team representing the rest of Australia under state of origin selection rules. The first was the AFL Hall of Fame Tribute Match, held on a free weekend in 2008 as part of that season's celebration of the 150th anniversary of the birth of Australian rules football. The second was the State of Origin for Bushfire Relief Match, a benefit match played during the 2020 preseason to raise funds for the recovery after the 2019–20 Australian bushfire season.

Importance
At its peak, interstate matches were among the most important events on the annual football calendar in South Australia, Western Australia and Tasmania. The crowds drawn to interstate matches in those states regularly dwarfed home-and-away crowds, and at times throughout history would match or exceed grand final attendances. In Perth, interstate matches at the 1921 carnival, during the 1929 season, and at the 1937 carnival successively set records as Western Australia's highest-ever sports crowd; the crowd of 40,000 drawn to that 1937 match was more than 10,000 higher than any previous Western Australian crowd and almost double the record club grand final crowd at that time. Likewise in Tasmania, carnival fixtures in 1924, 1947 and 1966 each set new Tasmanian state football attendance records, and the 1966 carnival crowd of 23,764 remains the third-highest football attendance in Tasmania's history. State of Origin matches in the 1980s in South Australia and Western Australia regularly drew crowds between 30,000 and 50,000, on par with grand finals in those states during that era; and interstate matches in Tasmania consistently drew crowds which either exceeded or were second only to the Tasmanian league's grand final attendances.

Interstate football was less popular in Victoria than it was in the other states. One match in Victoria in 1989 against South Australia set the national interstate football record crowd of 91,960, with 10,000 people turned away at the gate, and other large crowds at interstate games in Victoria were between 60,000 and 70,000, on par with some large home-and-away games but lower than a typical finals attendance. But, at its lowest, interstate games in Victoria during the 1930s could sometimes fail to draw 10,000 spectators – less than the average home-and-away crowd – at a time when state record crowds were drawn to the matches elsewhere. Eventually, due to these lower levels of public interest, less interstate football came to be played in Victoria: for the majority of the 1980s, when State of Origin football was at its peak, the Victorian team did not play a single match at home. The primary reason for the difference in popularity between Victoria and the other states was the Victorian team's historical dominance in interstate football. Particularly during the pre-State of Origin era, the Victorian team was always expected to win and regularly won easily; therefore, Victorian spectators were disinclined to attend matches because there was little importance on offer for victory and a high chance of a one-sided contest. The record crowd of 91,960 in Melbourne in 1989 came after South Australia had beaten Victoria three years in a row, demonstrating that Victorian fans were willing to embrace interstate football when the rivalry and contests were closely fought. Additionally, differences in supporter culture between the states meant that club football and club parochialism had much greater importance in Victoria than in the other states.

Amongst the competing states, the rivalry with Victoria was the strongest. Victoria's long-term dominance of interstate football created a culture of disdain towards it and, as a result, the most popular games always involved Victoria and beating Victoria was considered the pinnacle of interstate football in South Australia and Western Australia. South Australia's rivalry towards Victoria was characterised during the 1980s with the slogan "Kick a Vic".

Players from all states, including Victoria, viewed selection and participation in interstate football with great importance. Ted Whitten, who was widely noted for his involvement in and passion for the Victorian team described how "the players would walk on broken glass to wear the Victorian jumper". Graham Cornes, well known for his involvement in the South Australian team, always spoke equally proudly of the experience of representing his state. John Platten, a highly decorated player, described a drought-breaking victory playing for South Australia, over Victoria, as one of his proudest football moments. Comments from other players included:
 Matthew Lloyd (Victoria) –immense pride – you feel like you walk a bit taller when you pull on the Big V.
 Stephen O'Reilly (Western Australia) – State of Origin football is the pinnacle for AFL players.
 Andrew McKay (South Australia) – I never dreamt of playing VFL/AFL as a child, but I always dreamt of playing for my state.
 Graham Cornes (South Australia) – pulling the South Australian jumper on is like a dream come true.
 Tony Lockett (Victoria), who commented after he won the E. J. Whitten Medal – this will probably go down as one of the happiest days of my life, and I'll treasure it forever.

Selection criteria
The State of Origin eligibility rules varied from game to game, and matches during the 1980s were sometimes played under partial, rather than full, State of Origin rules. This was in large part so that neutral leagues were not disrupted by a stand-alone game between two other states; e.g. VFL clubs would not lose access to interstate origin players on the weekend of a game between South Australia and Western Australia. For example, in the stand-alone 1982 match between South Australia and Victoria, a quota of up to six VFL players of South Australian origin, and no more than one from any VFL club, could play for South Australia; but otherwise, all SANFL and VFL players were eligible to play for South Australia and Victoria respectively – indeed Victoria fielded five VFL players of Western Australian origin in that match, including their captain, Mike Fitzpatrick. Jason Dunstall and Terry Daniher, who were born in and recruited from Queensland and New South Wales respectively, both played several partial-origin matches for Victoria; and in a partial-origin match against Victoria in 1990. New South Wales was allowed to be represented by players of New South Welsh origin and any player who had played for the Sydney Swans and Queensland was allowed to be represented by players of Queensland origin and any player who had played for the Brisbane Bears/Lions. Changes made in 1990 set a player's state of origin based on his registered state at age 15.

Roger Merrett has played for and captained both Victoria (1984) and Queensland (1991).

State of Origin in popular media
Greg Champion wrote a song, "Don't Let The Big V Down", about the traditional navy blue jumper with a large white V used to represent Victoria in state games. The song is about a young man who is about to play his first state game and is approached by another man, who is Ted Whitten, and tells him to not let the Big V down.

Champion also wrote another song, Came From Adelaide, about two people watching a game between South Australia and Victoria. One of them turns to the other and says that the Croweaters cannot play. The other replies that this is not true and that the South Australians are great.

State & Territory & Representative Teams & Colours

 (M) = Men
 (M & W) = Men & Women
 (W) = Women

State  & Territory & Representative Teams & Games Played

 (M) = Men
 (M & W) = Men & Women
 (W) = Women

State  & Territory & Representative Teams & Team Awards

 (M) = Men
 (M & W) = Men & Women
 (W) = Women

Rivalries

Victoria vs South Australia
The rivalry between Victoria and South Australia was considered the strongest in state football. Although there is a bitter rivalry on both sides, the make up of the rivalry is slightly different: for Victoria, being the most successful state in interstate football, it meant that protecting that reputation was of prominent importance; for South Australia, the rivalry stemmed from dislike, and the feeling that Victorians did not give the state the respect it deserved. Graham Cornes, who was heavily involved in South Australian state football, described the football culture in Victoria as insular having a lack of regard for football outside their state, which drove that feeling.

Many footballers described beating Victoria as one of the top achievements in South Australian football. Neil Kerley ranked beating Victoria above his club premierships. Victorian footballers have commented on the passion and hatred directed towards them in interstate games played in Adelaide. Garry Lyon described the fans as "hostile and maniacal", and "by the time the games came around they were whipped into a frenzy". Paul Roos commented about the first state game he played in South Australia that "when walking up the entrance and onto Football Park was an experience in itself.  I quickly realised how much hatred existed towards Victorians and their football."

Victoria vs Western Australia
There is also an intense rivalry between Victoria and Western Australia. Western Australia's rivalry likewise stemmed from the feeling in Western Australia that Victoria never gave their state the credit it deserved, despite some of the best players of all time coming from the state. The Victorian and Western Australian rivalry was summarised in the early part of the 20th century as a friendly rivalry. In contrast with the Victoria vs South Australia rivalry which is based on hatred. This was evident in the first match between Victoria and Western Australia in Melbourne in 1904, where before the game the home victorians put on a function for the two sides, as a welcome. The function was reported to be well received by both sides. This is in contrast to the previous years Victoria vs South Australia game in Melbourne, where no such function was held. After the rivalry evolved from first to the latter half of the 20th century, when Victoria stated to lure many of Western Australia's best players because of money, the rivalry started to take on dislike from Western Australia's part.

Some games widely regarded as some of the best in the history of Australian football were played between Victoria and Western Australia in the 1980s. Shane Parker a former Western Australia player, said of the rivalry "When I was a kid, the State of Origin games were the greatest ever. It was a really big thing to see the WA side play, particularly against Victoria".

Western Australia vs South Australia
There was also an intense rivalry between Western Australia and South Australia, with fans at games between the states always vociferous and parochial.

Queensland vs New South Wales
The two states where rugby football is most popular have a rivalry in rugby and this is reflected also in their Australian rules encounters, having been evenly matched since they first met in the 1880s. While Queensland has shied away from competing in carnivals that include the stronger states, the neighbouring states have played at times annually. The gap narrowed until the 1970s after which on the few occasions they have met, Queensland has once again had the upper hand. State of Origin matches between the two in the 1980s were promoted to capitalise on the popularity of the Rugby League State of Origin.

Results

Australian National Football Carnival (1908–1993)
For most of the 20th century there was a national football carnival usually held every three to five years. Some of the carnivals the format consisted of qualification matches at the start of the tournament, with the winners playing off in a final. In some other carnivals the format was a round-robin format, with a points system in which the team with most points at the end of the tournament was declared the winner.
The national football carnival was played under the State of Residence rules from 1908 to 1975, and then played under the State of Origin rules from 1979 to 1993

Australian Rules State of Residence Matches (1904–2022)
The team names in bold indicate the winning teams.

|- style="background:#ccf;"
! style="width:01%;"| Year
! style="width:03%;"| Round
! style="width:06%;"| Home team
! style="width:05%;"| Score
! style="width:06%;"| Away team
! style="width:05%;"| Score
! style="width:05%;"| Ground
! style="width:02%;"| City
! style="width:04%;"| Crowd
! style="width:02%;"| Date
! style="width:04%;"| Time
! style="width:04%;"| Network
|- style="background:#fff;"
| 1995
|
| QAFL
| 9.17 (71)
| WAFL
| 14.14 (98)
| Gabba
| Brisbane
| 2,200
| 2/07/1995
|
|- style="background:#fff;"
| 1990
|
| SANFL
| 17.19 (121)
| WAFL
| 24.26 (100)
| Football Park
| Adelaide
| 21,231
| 8/07/1990
|
|- style="background:#fff;"
| 1988
|
| SANFL
| 17.17 (119)
| WAFL
| 11.13 (79)
| Football Park
| Adelaide
| 18,339
| 24/05/1988
|
| Ten
|- style="background:#fff;"
| 1987
|
| WAFL
| 9.9 (63)
| SANFL
| 18.16 (124)
| WACA Ground
| Perth
|
|
|
| ABC
|- style="background:#fff;"'
| 1986
|
| WAFL
| 18.19 (127)
| SANFL
| 12.16. (88)
| Football Park
| Adelaide
|
|
|
|
|- style=background:#fff;
| 1985
|
| WAFL
| 16.15 (111)
| SANFL
| 30.18 (198)
| Subiaco Oval
| Perth
|
| 15/06/1985
|
|
|- style=background:#fff;
| 1984
|
| SANFL
| 14.13 (97)
| WAFL
| 14.14 (98)
| Football Park
| Adelaide
| 26,649
|
|
| Seven

|- style="background:#fff;"
|-
| 1983
|
| WAFL
| 24.14 (134)
| SANFL
| 16.14 (110)
| Subiaco Oval
| Perth
|
| 04/06/1983
|
| Seven

|- style="background:#fff;"
| 1977
|
| WAFL
| 13.12 (90)
| VFL
| 23.16 (154)
| Subiaco Oval
| Perth
| 44,891
| 25/06/1977
|
|  Seven

Australian Rules State of Origin Matches (1977–1999)
The team('s) name(s) in bold indicates the winning team(s)

Key - 1979 Perth State of Origin Carnival:
 S1QPO = Section 1 Qualification Play Off
 S1SF1 = Section 1 Semi Final 1
 S1SF2 = Section 1 Semi Final 2
 S13PP = Section 1 3rd Place Playoff
 S1GF = Section 1 Grand Final
 S2GF = Section 2 Grand Final

Key - 1980 Adelaide State of Origin Carnival:
 SF1 = Semi Final 1
 SF2 = Semi Final 2
 3PF = 3rd Place Final
 GF = Grand Final
Note - 1980: Double-headers on the 11th of October and on the 13 of October respectively.

Note - 1985: The match between South Australia and Victoria was awarded to South Australia on protest, as a result of Victoria playing with 4 interchange players instead of the permitted 3 interchange players.[3].

Key - 1988 Adelaide Bicentennial Carnival:
 S1 SF = Section 1 Semi Final
 S1 3PPO = Section 1 3rd Place Play Off
 S1 GF = Section 1 Grand Final
 S2 PS = Section 2 Preliminary Stage
 S2 WSPO = Section 2 Wooden Spoon Play Off
 S2 GF = Section 2 Grand Final

Key - 1993 State of Origin Championships:
 S1 SF1 = Section 1 Semi Final 1
 S1 SF2 = Section 1 Semi Final 2
 S1 GF = Section 1 Grand Final
 S2 GF = Section 2 Grand Final

|- style="background:#ccf;"
! style="width:01%;"| Year
! style="width:03%;"| Round
! style="width:06%;"| Home team
! style="width:05%;"| Score
! style="width:06%;"| Away team
! style="width:05%;"| Score
! style="width:05%;"| Ground
! style="width:02%;"| City
! style="width:04%;"| Crowd
! style="width:02%;"| Date
! style="width:04%;"| Time
! style="width:04%;"| Network
|- style="background:#fff;"
| 1999
|
| Victoria
| 17.19 (121)
| South Australia
| 10.7 (67)
| MCG
| Melbourne
| 26,063
| 29/05/1999
| 2:00 PM
| Seven
|-
| 1998
|
| Allies
| 14.11 (95)
| Victoria
| 22.16 (148)
| Gabba
| Brisbane
| 13,977
| 10/07/1998
| 7:00 PM
| Seven
|- style="background:#fff;"
| 1998
|
| South Australia
| 22.11 (143)
| West. Australia
| 16.11 (107)
| Football Park
| Adelaide
| 18,204
| 11/07/1998
| 4:00 PM
| Seven
|- style="background:#fff;"
| 1997
|
| South Australia
| 12.13 (85)
| Victoria
| 13.15 (93)
| Football Park
| Adelaide
| 40,595
| 21/06/1997
| 8:00 PM
| Seven
|- style="background:#fff;"
| 1997
|
| West. Australia
| 16.12 (108)
| Allies
| 18.8 (116)
| Subiaco Oval
| Perth
| 16,795
| 20/06/1997
| 6:00 PM
| Seven
|- style="background:#fff;"
| 1996
|
| South Australia
| 20.6 (126)
| West. Australia
| 13.13 (91)
| Football Park
| Adelaide
| 16,722
| 02/06/1996
| 2:30 PM
| Seven
|- style="background:#fff;"
| 1996
|
| Victoria
| 20.17 (137)
| Allies
| 11.18 (84)
| MCG
| Melbourne
| 35,612
| 01/06/1996
| 2:10 PM
| Seven
|- style="background:#fff;"
| 1995
|
| Victoria
| 18.12 (120)
| South Australia
| 8.9 (57)
| MCG
| Melbourne
| 64,186
| 17/06/1995
| 2:00 PM
| Seven
|- style="background:#fff;"
| 1995
|
| West. Australia
| 8.13 (61)
| Allies
| 13.14 (92)
| Subiaco Oval
| Perth
| 15,722
| 18/06/1995
| 12:00 PM
| Seven
|- style="background:#fff;"
| 1994
|
| South Australia
| 11.9 (75)
| Victoria
| 10.13 (73)
| Football Park
| Adelaide
| 44,598
| 03/05/1994
| 8:00 PM
| Seven
|- style="background:#fff;"
| 1993
| S1 SF1
| Victoria
| 19.16 (130)
| NSW/ACT
| 8.17 (65)
| MCG
| Melbourne
| 22,409
| 01/06/1993
| 7:00 PM
| Seven
|- style="background:#fff;"
| 1993
| S1 SF2
| South Australia
| 19.13 (127)
| West. Australia
| 14.7 (91)
| Football Park
| Adelaide
| 21,487
| 02/06/1993
| 8:00 PM
| Seven
|- style="background:#fff;"
| 1993
| S1 GF
| Victoria
| 14.13 (97)
| South Australia
| 16.13 (109)
| MCG
| Melbourne
| 31,792
| 05/06/1993
| 4:40 PM
| Seven
|- style="background:#fff;"
| 1993
| S2 GF
| Tasmania
| 10.13 (73)
| Queensland/NT
| 16.14 (110)
| Bellerive Oval
| Hobart
| 9,660
| 06/06/1993
| 12:00 PM
| Seven
|- style="background:#fff;"
| 1992
|
| New South Wales
| 22.9 (141)
| Queensland
| 6.12 (48)
| SCG
| Sydney
| 7,223
| 12/05/1992
| 7:00 PM
| Seven
|- style="background:#fff;"
| 1992
|
| Victoria
| 23.19 (157)
| West. Australia
| 13.12 (90)
| MCG
| Melbourne
| 32,152
| 26/05/1992
| 7:00 PM
| Seven
|- style="background:#fff;"
| 1992
|
| South Australia
| 19.19 (133)
| Victoria
| 18.12 (120)
| Football Park
| Adelaide
| 33,984
| 07/07/1992
| 12:00 PM
| Seven
|- style="background:#fff;"
| 1991
|
| Tasmania
| 14.20 (104)
| Victoria
| 17.14 (116)
| N. Hobart Oval
| Hobart
| 16,000
| 28/05/1991
| 12:00 PM
| Seven
|- style="background:#fff;"
| 1991
|
| South Australia
| 11.4 (70)
| Victoria
| 12.14 (86)
| Football Park
| Adelaide
| 37,277
| 28/05/1991
| 8:00 PM
| Seven
|- style="background:#fff;"
| 1991
|
| Queensland
| 23.14 (152)
| Victoria
| 15.8 (108)
| Gabba
| Brisbane
| 8,519
| 16/07/1991
| 12:00 PM
| Seven
|- style="background:#fff;"
| 1991
|
| West. Australia
| 19.13 (127)
| Victoria
| 7.9 (51)
| WACA Ground
| Perth
| 24,397
| 16/07/1991
| 12:00 PM
| Seven
|- style=background:#fff;
| 1991
|
| West. Australia
| 17.20 (122)
| South Australia
| 11.12 (78)
| Subiaco Oval
| Perth
|
|
|
| Seven
|- style="background:#fff;"
| 1990
|
| New South Wales
| 13.8 (86)
| Victoria
| 10.16 (76)
| SCG
| Sydney
| 13,482
| 22/05/1990
| 8:30 PM
| Seven
|- style="background:#fff;"
| 1990
|
| Tasmania
| 20.14 (134)
| Victoria
| 14.17 (101)
| N. Hobart Oval
| Hobart
| 18,649
| 24/06/1990
| 12:00 PM
| Seven
|- style="background:#fff;"
| 1990
|
| West. Australia
| 8.12 (60)
| Victoria
| 14.13 (97)
| WACA Ground
| Perth
| 21,897
| 26/06/1990
| 6:30 PM
| Seven
|- style=background:#fff;
| 1990
|
| South Australia
| 17.19 (122)
| West. Australia
| 14.16 (100)
| Football Park
| Adelaide
|
|
|
| Seven
|- style="background:#fff;"
| 1989
|
| West. Australia
| 10.12 (72)
| Victoria
| 19.12 (126)
| WACA Ground
| Perth
| 20,993
| 16/05/1989
| 12:00 PM
| Seven
|- style="background:#fff;"
| 1989
|
| Victoria
| 22.17 (149)
| South Australia
| 9.9 (63)
| MCG
| Melbourne
| 91,960
| 01/07/1989
| 2:10 PM
| Seven
|- style="background:#fff;"
| 1989
|
| Tasmania
| 15.7 (107)
| Victoria
| 25.13 (163)
| N. Hobart Oval
| Hobart
| 12,342
| 02/07/1989
| 12:00 PM
| Seven
|- style="background:#fff;"
| 1988
| S2 PS
| North. Territory
| 19.20 (134)
| Tasmania
| 10.8 (68)
| Football Park
| Adelaide
| –
| 02/03/1988
|
| Nine
|- style="background:#fff;"
| 1988
| S2 PS
| Amateurs
| 14.12 (96)
| ACT
| 12.11 (83)
| Football Park
| Adelaide
| –
| 02/03/1988
|
| Nine
|- style="background:#fff;"
| 1988
| S1 SF
| Victoria (VFL)
| 20.13 (133)
| West. Australia
| 10.13 (73)
| Football Park
| Adelaide
| 5,195
| 02/03/1988
|
| Nine
|- style="background:#fff;"
| 1988
| S2 PS
| Victoria (VFA)
| 17.10 (112)
| Queensland
| 4.11 (35)
| Football Park
| Adelaide
| –
| 03/03/1988
|
| Nine
|- style="background:#fff;"
| 1988
| S2 PS
| North. Territory
| 11.19 (85)
| Amateurs
| 8.9 (57)
| Football Park
| Adelaide
| –
| 03/03/1988
|
| Nine
|- style="background:#fff;"
| 1988
| S1 SF
|  South Australia
| 12.8 (80)
| New South Wales
| 8.11 (59)
| Football Park
| Adelaide
| 5,755
| 03/03/1988
|
| Nine
|- style="background:#fff;"
| 1988
| S2 SF
| Victoria (VFA)
| 18.20 (128)
| ACT
| 9.16 (70)
| Norwood Oval
| Adelaide
| –
| 04/03/1988
|
| Nine
|- style="background:#fff;"
| 1988
| S2 WSPO
| Tasmania
| 11.16 (82)
| Queensland
| 10.10 (70)
| Norwood Oval
| Adelaide
| –
| 04/03/1988
|
| Nine
|- style="background:#fff;"
| 1988
| S2 GF
| North. Territory
| 17.10 (112)
| Victoria
| 9.13 (63)
| Football Park
| Adelaide
| –
| 05/03/1988
|
| Nine
|- style="background:#fff;"
| 1988
| S1 3PPO
| New South Wales
| 10.8 (68)
| West. Australia
| 9.12 (66)
| Football Park
| Adelaide
| –
| 05/03/1988
|
| Nine
|- style="background:#fff;"
| 1988
| S1 GF
| South Australia
| 15.12 (102)
| Victoria (VFL)
| 6.6 (42)
| Football Park
| Adelaide
| 19,387
| 05/03/1988
|
| Nine
|- style="background:#fff;"
| 1988
|
| West. Australia
| 15.9 (99)
| Victoria
| 21.23 (149)
| Subiaco Oval
| Perth
| 23,006
| 05/07/1988
|
|
|- style=background:#fff;
| 1988
|
| West. Australia
| 18.14 (122)
| South Australia
| 17.13 (115)
| BC Place
| Vancouver
|
|
|
| Nine
|- style="background:#fff;"
| 1987
|
| South Australia
| 12.13 (85)
| Victoria
| 11.15 (81)
| Football Park
| Adelaide
| 41,605
| 27/05/1987
|
| ABC
|- style="background:#fff;"
| 1987
|
| West. Australia
| 13.14 (92)
| Victoria
| 16.20 (116)
| Subiaco Oval
| Perth
| 22,000
| 22/07/1987
|
| ABC
|- style="background:#fff;"
| 1986
|
| South Australia
| 18.17 (125)
| Victoria
| 17.13 (115)
| Football Park
| Adelaide
| 43,143
| 13/05/1986
|
|
|- style="background:#fff;"
| 1986
|
| West. Australia
| 21.11 (137)
| Victoria
| 20.14 (134)
| Subiaco Oval
| Perth
| 39,863
| 08/07/1986
|
|
|- style="background:#fff;"
| 1985
|
| South Australia
| 11.10 (76)*
| Victoria
| 20.13 (133)
| Football Park
| Adelaide
| 44,287
| 14/05/1985
|
|
|- style=background:#fff:
| 1985
|
| West. Australia
| 9.11 (65)
| Victoria
| 19.16 (130)
| Subiaco Oval
| Perth
| 38,000
| 16/07/1985
|
|
|- style="background:#fff;"
| 1984
|
| South Australia
| 16.8 (104)
| Victoria
| 16.12 (108)
| Football Park
| Adelaide
| 52,719
| 15/05/1984
|
| Seven
|- style="background:#fff;"
| 1984
|
| West. Australia
| 21.16 (142)
| Victoria
| 21.12 (138)
| Subiaco Oval
| Perth
| 42,500
| 17/07/1984
|
| Seven
|- style="background:#fff;"
| 1983
|
| South Australia
| 26.16 (172)
| Victoria
| 17.14 (116)
| Football Park
| Adelaide
| 42,521
| 16/07/1983
|
| Seven
|- style="background:#fff;"
| 1983
|
| West. Australia
| 16.22 (118)
| Victoria
| 16.19 (115)
| Subiaco Oval
| Perth
| 44,213
| 12/07/1983
|
| Seven
|- style="background:#fff;"
| 1982
|
| South Australia
| 18.19 (127)
| Victoria
| 21.13 (139)
| Football Park
| Adelaide
| 40,399
| 17/05/1982
|
|
|- style="background:#fff;"
| 1982
|
| West. Australia
| 15.11 (101)
| Victoria
| 19.10 (124)
| Subiaco Oval
| Perth
| 29,182
| 13/07/1982
|
|
|- style=background:#fff;
| 1982
|
| South Australia
| 29.23 (197)
| West. Australia
| 12.9 (81)
| Football Park
| Adelaide
| 27,283
|
|
|
|- style=background:#fff;
| 1982
|
| West. Australia
| 21.18 (144)
| South Australia
| 8.5 (53)
| Subiaco Oval
| Perth
|
|
|
|
|- style="background:#fff;"
| 1981
|
| West. Australia
| 16.23 (119)
| Victoria
| 13.12 (90)
| Subiaco Oval
| Perth
| 26,000
| 27/04/1981
|
|
|- style="background:#fff;"
| 1981
|
| Tasmania
| 16.12 (108)
| Victoria
| 31.20 (206)
| N. Hobart Oval
| Hobart
| 6,349
| 04/07/1981
|
|
|- style="background:#fff;"
| 1981
|
| Queensland
| 12.18 (90)
| Victoria
| 32.29 (221)
| Gabba
| Brisbane
| 9,000
| 12/07/1981
|
|
|- style="background:#fff;"
| 1980
|
| Victoria
| 18.15 (123)
| West. Australia
| 15.12 (102)
| VFL Park
| Melbourne
| 31,467
| 05/07/1980
|
|
|- style="background:#fff;"
| 1980
|
| Queensland
| 16.10 (106)
| Victoria
| 28.18 (186)
| Gabba
| Brisbane
| 16,000
| 06/07/1980
|
|
|- style="background:#fff;"
| 1980
|
| ACT
| 13.17 (95)
| Victoria
| 11.16 (82)
| Manuka Oval
| Canberra
| 10,600
| 06/07/1980
|
|
|- style=background:#fff;
| 1980
|
| West. Australia
| 21.30 (156)
| South Australia
| 10.9 (69)
| Subiaco Oval
| Perth
|
|
|
|
|- style="background:#fff;"
| 1980
| SF1
| South Australia| 22.18 (150)| Tasmania
| 8.13 (61)
| Football Park
| Adelaide
| 10,666
| 11/10/1980
|
| Seven
|- style="background:#fff;"
| 1980
| SF2
| Victoria| 14.20 (104)| West. Australia
| 9.15 (69)
| Football Park
| Adelaide
| 10,666
| 11/10/1980
|
| Seven
|- style="background:#fff;"
| 1980
| 3PF
| West. Australia| 17.23 (125)| Tasmania
| 12.18 (90)
| Football Park
| Adelaide
| 17,579
| 13/10/1980
|
| Seven
|- style="background:#fff;"
| 1980
| GF
| Victoria| 15.12 (102)| South Australia
| 12.13 (85)
| Football Park
| Adelaide
| 17,579
| 13/10/1980
|
| Seven
|- style="background:#fff;"
| 1979
|
| South Australia
| 6.13 (49)
| Victoria| 15.20 (110)| Football Park
| Adelaide
| 32,054
| 21/05/1979
|
|
|- style="background:#fff;"
| 1979
|
| Tasmania
| 8.14 (62)
| Victoria| 26.21 (177)| N. Hobart Oval
| Hobart
| 12,197
| 18/06/1979
|
| Seven
|- style="background:#fff;"
| 1979
| S1 QPO
| Tasmania| 17.20 (122)| Queensland
| 13.12 (90)
| Perth Oval
| Perth
| –
| 04/10/1979
|
| Seven
|- style="background:#fff;"
| 1979
| S1 SF1
| West. Australia| 23.33 (171)| Tasmania
| 9.10 (64)
| Subiaco Oval
| Perth
| –
| 06/10/1979
|
| Seven
|- style="background:#fff;"
| 1979
| S1 SF2
| Victoria| 25.30 (180)| South Australia
| 20.15 (135)
| Subiaco Oval
| Perth
| 15,186
| 06/10/1979
|
| Seven
|- style="background:#fff;"
| 1979
| S2 GF
| Queensland| 23.13 (151)| ACT
| 18.12 (120)
| Leederville Oval
| Perth
| –
| 07/10/1979
|
|
|- style="background:#fff;"
| 1979
| S1 3PP
| South Australia| 22.20 (152)| Tasmania
| 17.11 (113)
| Subiaco Oval
| Perth
| –
| 08/10/1979
|
| Seven
|- style="background:#fff;"
| 1979
| S1 GF
| West. Australia| 17.21 (123)| Victoria
| 16.12 (108)
| Subiaco Oval
| Perth
| 30,876
| 08/10/1979
|
| Seven
|- style="background:#fff;"
| 1978
|
| Tasmania
| 18.6 (114)
| Victoria| 25.11 (161)| N. Hobart Oval
| Hobart
| 16,776
| 10/06/1978
|
|
|- style="background:#fff;"
| 1978
|
| Victoria| 25.13 (163)| West. Australia
| 8.15 (63)
| VFL Park
| Melbourne
| 45,192
| 10/06/1978
|
|
|- style="background:#fff;"
| 1978
|
| ACT
| 12.11 (83)
| Victoria| 21.21 (147)| Manuka Oval
| Canberra
| 10,300
| 11/06/1978
|
|
|- style="background:#fff;"
| 1978
|
| West. Australia
| 14.17 (101)
| Victoria| 17.13 (115)| Subiaco Oval
| Perth
| 30,195
| 07/10/1978
|
|  Seven
|- style="background:#fff;"
| 1977
|
| West. Australia| 23.13 (151)| Victoria
| 8.9 (57)
| Subiaco Oval
| Perth
| 25,467
| 08/10/1977
|
|  Seven

AFL Women's State of Origin (2017)
After the success of the inaugural AFL Women's season the AFL announced in mid-July that a State of Origin representative match would be held for AFL Women's players during the AFL season pre-finals bye. A team of players born in Victoria played a single exhibition match against Allies (a team of players from the rest of Australia) at Etihad Stadium on the evening of Saturday 2 September.

AFL Hall of Fame Tribute Match (2008)

AFL State of Origin for Bushfire Relief Match (2020)

Other interstate matches

State league representative matches (1990–present)
With the advent of interstate teams into the expanding VFL and its eventual re-badging and change to a national league in 1990, the state leagues undertook steps to ensure that representative football would not be reserved solely for those players in the Australian Football League. State League Representative matches would allow those players participating in competitions that would be, in later years, categorised as second-tier leagues, to be selected for interstate duties. For the most part during the ensuing years between the inception of State League and the end of Origin, it was the South Australian and Western Australian leagues championing the concept with the two leagues facing off many times. The other state leagues did take part in the concept, but on a far more limited basis. The Queensland, ACT and Tasmanian competitions featured on several occasions, the New South Wales league made scattered appearances while the Northern Territory was far less featured on the interstate stage mainly due to their domestic league being played in a different part of the year. Meetings between those competitions and the SANFL or WAFL were a rare occurrence.

The Victorian Football Association eventually made some appearances of their own at state league level from 1994, but also did not have games against South Australia or Western Australia for a few years. Eventually, after a restructure of that competition in 1996 which saw them adopt the name of the VFL, they faced the SANFL on the MCG in the curtain raiser to what would be the swansong of State of Origin football in 1999. From this day onwards, interstate football would become the domain of the leagues that underpin the AFL. In the years following, the participation of the "non-traditional" football states was not as high as that of South Australia, Western Australia and Victoria. Queensland and the Australian Capital Territory continued to play a part, while Tasmania's football system was split in half between north and south, as well as the state team being replaced by a club—Tasmanian Devils—which entered the VFL in 2001. The "Big 3" in the SANFL, WAFL and VFL entered into an agreement in 2003 to adopt a program where they would play each other in a rotational system over three years, which saw one state either sit out interstate football for one season or require that league to find alternative opposition.

Towards the end of the 2000s, the AFL by this time had control of the football administrations across the eastern states and the Northern Territory. Tasmania withdrew from the VFL and relaunched the statewide Tasmanian State League competition in 2009, then in 2011 the AFL created the North East Australian Football League out of established state league teams from New South Wales, the Australian Capital Territory, Queensland and the Northern Territory as well as reserves sides from the four AFL clubs in those regions. With this, the representative football calendar would virtually encompass all of Australia. At first the NEAFL's conference system would allow two representative sides with Queensland and the Northern Territory making up the Northern conference team and the New South Wales and Australian Capital Territory combination forming the Eastern conference side. A couple of years later, the NEAFL would be represented by a single team. How this arrangement fits into the individual state league schedules is still being worked on, but it has largely not disrupted the existing arrangements undertaken by the traditional football states. In fact, what would normally have been a "bye" year for the SANFL, WAFL or VFL allows them to instead play the NEAFL or the TSL.

Under this arrangement, the leagues of New South Wales (AFL Sydney), the Australian Capital Territory (AFL Canberra) and Queensland (QAFL) were effectivelly relegated to third-tier status behind the NEAFL and, as a result, any representative matches involving opposition outside of these territories have involved amateur-level leagues.

The state league representative matches, like State of Origin matches, also have individual best on ground medals:
 Queensland and Northern Territory (NEAFL North): Zane Taylor Medal
 South Australia (SANFL): Fos Williams Medal
 Victoria (VFA/VFL): Frank Johnson Medal
 Western Australia (WAFL): Simpson Medal
 Tasmania (TSL): Lefroy Medal

ResultsBold' text indicates the home team.

Intrastate representative football

 E. J. Whitten Legends Game (1996–present) 

Following the death of Ted Whitten – who is regarded as one of the finest ever players of Australian rules – from prostate cancer in 1995, his son Ted Whitten Jr organised an interstate charity match between teams of retired players, to raise money for research into the disease. The only two teams which have taken part in these games are Victoria and the All Stars'' (similar to the AFL's "Allies"), who represent the rest of Australia. The first E. J. Whitten Legends Game was played at Whitten Oval in 1996, and it has become an annual event. The games have often attracted crowds of over 10,000, and this has resulted in it being moved from the Whitten Oval to Optus Oval, to Adelaide Oval (South Australia) and finally to Etihad Stadium.

References

External links 
 AustralianFootball.com, "Interstate Football"
 Convict Creations State of Origin
 AFL Statistics

Australian rules football records and statistics
Australian rules interstate football
History of Australian rules football